Dakamela is a small settlement in Matabeleland North, Zimbabwe and is located about 140 km north-west of Gweru in the Nkayi District close to the Shangani River.

Populated places in Matabeleland North Province